"Charity" is a song by Skunk Anansie, released as their third single on 21 August 1995 and re-released on 15 April 1996. The original release reached number 40 on the UK Singles Chart while the re-release reached number 20. In Iceland, the song became the band's first of three number-one singles. When re-released, two new CDs were made available. CD1 contains live versions of "I Can Dream" and "Punk by Numbers", and CD2 includes live versions of tracks from Paranoid & Sunburnt.

Music video
The music video was directed by David Mould. Stills of the music video were used as covers for the single.

Track listings
Original release CD single

Re-release CD single: CD1

Re-release CD single: CD2

10-inch vinyl

Charts

Weekly charts

Year-end charts

References

Skunk Anansie songs
1995 singles
1995 songs
Number-one singles in Iceland
One Little Indian Records singles
Songs written by Len Arran
Songs written by Skin (musician)